Philip John Robinson (born 6 January 1967) is an English former footballer who played as a midfielder for Aston Villa, Wolverhampton Wanderers, Notts County, Birmingham City, Huddersfield Town, Northampton Town, Chesterfield, Stoke City, Hereford United and Stafford Rangers. He is Manchester City's international youth scouting and recruitment manager.

Career
Robinson was born in Stafford and began his career with Aston Villa in 1985. He then played for Wolverhampton Wanderers for two seasons which ended with back to back promotions and then achieved the same feat with Notts County. After a short loan spell with Birmingham City, during which he was part of the side that won the 1990–91 Associate Members' Cup, Robinson played two years at Huddersfield Town and played on loan for Northampton Town before joining Chesterfield helping the side gain promotion 1994–95 and then made a return to Notts County where he enjoyed his fifth promotion in 1997–98. Robinson joined Stoke City in June 1998 and played 44 times in 1998–99 and was made captain by Gary Megson for the 1999–2000 campaign. He then went on to play for Hereford United to later become player-coach under manager Graham Turner.

Robinson spent six years as manager of home-town club Stafford Rangers. Appointed in summer 2002 after a spell with Hereford United, he guided the team to four high-finishing positions in the league, promotion back to the Conference, three Staffordshire Senior Cup finals, FA Cup First Round three times and FA Trophy quarter finals. He resigned on 2 December 2007.

Later career
He graduated from the University of Salford in 1999 with a degree in Physiotherapy.

In June 2008, he took up a temporary coaching role with Cheltenham Town to cover for the absence through injury of Bob Bloomer. In October 2008, he joined Birmingham City to oversee recruitment to their Academy. Robinson was then appointed as head of talent identification at Aston Villa before joining Manchester City as international youth scouting and recruitment manager.

Career statistics
Source:

Honours
Wolverhampton Wanderers
 Football League Fourth Division champions: 1987–88
 Football League Third Division champions: 1988–89

Notts County
 Football League Third Division third-place promotion: 1989–90
 Football League Second Division play-off winner: 1991
 Football League Third Division champions: 1997–98

Birmingham City
 Associate Members' Cup winners: 1991

Chesterfield
 Football League Third Division third-place promotion: 1994–95

References

External links
 

1967 births
Living people
Sportspeople from Stafford
English footballers
Association football midfielders
Aston Villa F.C. players
Wolverhampton Wanderers F.C. players
Notts County F.C. players
Birmingham City F.C. players
Huddersfield Town A.F.C. players
Northampton Town F.C. players
Chesterfield F.C. players
Stoke City F.C. players
Hereford United F.C. players
Stafford Rangers F.C. players
English Football League players
National League (English football) players
English football managers
Stafford Rangers F.C. managers
Cheltenham Town F.C. non-playing staff
Alumni of the University of Salford